Gulkand (also written gulqand or gulkhand) is a sweet preserve of rose petals originating in the Indian subcontinent. The term is derived from Persian; gul (rose) and qand (sugar/sweet).

Preparation 
Traditionally, gulkand has been prepared with Damask roses. Other common types of roses used include China rose, French rose, and Cabbage rose. It is prepared using special pink rose petals and is mixed with sugar. Rose petals are slow-cooked with sugar, which reduces the juices into a thick consistency.

Uses in holistic medicine 
Gulkand is used in the Unani system of medicine as a cooling tonic. It is also used in Ayurvedic and Persian medicine to help with bodily imbalances.

References

Indian condiments
Pakistani cuisine
Alternative medicine
Roses